Beatričė Pundžiūtė (born 16 April 1998), known professionally as Beatrich, is a Lithuanian pop music singer and songwriter.

Biography
Pundžiūtė was born in Kaunas, but moved to Šilute at a very young age. She was born in a medical family. While still in kindergarten, she sang in a small ensemble, played and sang in a country music group at school, and also studied violin at a music school. After finishing school, she moved to Kaunas. After becoming famous, Pundžiūtė moved to Los Angeles, and currently lives in London, returning to Lithuania for concerts.

  On a podcast (Nesiaukite vol.50 - Beatrich) she mentioned, that she was born in Kaunas, but in her birth certificate its written that she was born in Šilutė.

Musical career
On 20 December 2022, it was announced that Beatrich would participate in the Lithuanian national selection for Eurovision "Pabandom iš naujo! 2023" with the song "Like a Movie". The song was publicly released in January. She participated in the second heat and came in first place.  She performed her song once again in the second semi final and came in first place again, thus qualifying to the final. In the final of the competition, she finished in third place with a total of 16 points.

Discography

Studio albums

Singles

Awards and nominations

References 

1998 births
Living people
People from Šilutė
21st-century Lithuanian women singers
Lithuanian pop singers
Lithuanian songwriters
English-language singers from Lithuania
Lithuanian expatriates in England